Dragan Jovanović is a Serbian water polo goalkeeper and later coach.

He coached Canada national team at the 2008 Summer Olympics.

References

Year of birth missing (living people)
Living people
Serbian male water polo players
World Aquatics Championships medalists in water polo
Competitors at the 1997 Mediterranean Games
Mediterranean Games gold medalists for Yugoslavia
Mediterranean Games medalists in water polo
Serbian water polo coaches
Canada men's national water polo team coaches
Water polo coaches at the 2008 Summer Olympics